Słowiki  is a village in the administrative district of Gmina Koźminek, within Kalisz County, Greater Poland Voivodeship, in west-central Poland.

The village has a population of 120.

References

Villages in Kalisz County